Elections to city, county, district, town, neighborhood, village and workers' district people's assemblies were held in North Korea on November 28, 1959.

In the elections, 9,759 city, county and district people's assembly deputies and 53,882 town, neighborhood, village and workers' district people's assembly deputies were elected. Voter turnout was reported as 100%, with candidates receiving a 100% approval rate.

References

1959 in North Korea
North Korea
Local elections in North Korea
November 1959 events in Asia